
The Inner Light or Inner Light may refer to:

Beliefs 
 Inner light, concept which many Quakers use to express their conscience, faith, and beliefs
 Fraternity of the Inner Light, a 1924 magical society and Western mystery school
 Temple of the True Inner Light, a temple in Manhattan which believes entheogen drugs to be the true God

Songs 
 "The Inner Light" (song), a 1968 B-side single by The Beatles
 "Inner Light" (song), the 2000 debut single from Oakland Hip Hop group Zion I

Media 
 "The Inner Light" (Star Trek: The Next Generation), 1992, the 25th episode of the fifth season of the American science fiction television series Star Trek: The Next Generation

See also
 Divine light, one of God's expressions in some mystical, religions, and spiritual paths